McGurrin is a surname. Notable people with the surname include:

Bernard McGurrin (born 1933), English rugby league footballer 
Frank Edward McGurrin (1861–1933), American stenographer and inventor
Terry McGurrin (born 1968), Canadian voice actor, comedian, and writer